The Lions–Vikings rivalry is an American football rivalry between the Detroit Lions and Minnesota Vikings. It is the most lopsided divisional rivalry in the NFC based on winning percentage.

The Lions and Vikings have played twice annually since the Vikings entered the league’s Western Conference in 1961.  The two teams moved to the NFC Central after the AFL-NFL merger in 1970, which became the NFC North after the NFL's 2002 realignment.  This is the only NFC North rivalry without any head-to-head postseason meetings. Both teams play in indoor stadiums, and both are known for their bad luck.

Since the rivalry's establishment with the Vikings joining the NFL in 1961, Minnesota has largely dominated the series. The most lopsided decades were in the 1970s and 2000s, with the Vikings going 35–5 against the Lions in those two decades. The Vikings lead the series 80–41–2 as of 2022.

Game results 

|-
| 
| style="| 
| style="| Lions  13–7 
| style="| Lions  37–10
| Lions  2–0
| Vikings join NFL as an expansion team. 
|-
| 
| style="| 
| style="| Lions  37–23 
| style="| Lions  17–6
| Lions  4–0
| 
|-
| 
| Tie 1–1
| style="| Lions  28–10 
| style="| Vikings  34–31
| Lions  5–1
|
|-
| 
| style="| 
| Tie  23–23 
| style="| Lions  24–20
| Lions  6–1–1
| 
|-
| 
| Tie 1–1
| style="| Vikings  29–7
| style="| Lions  31–29 
| Lions  7–2–1
| 
|-
| 
| Tie 1–1
| style="| Vikings  28–16
| style="| Lions  32–31 
| Lions  8–3–1
| 
|-
| 
| style="| 
| style="| Lions  14–3
| Tie  10–10 
| Lions  9–3–2
| 
|-
| 
| style="| 
| style="| Vikings   13–6 
| style="| Vikings   24–10
| Lions  9–5–2
| 
|-
| 
| style="| 
| style="| Vikings   27–0 
| style="| Vikings   24–10
| Lions  9–7–2
| Detroit meeting took place on Thanksgiving. Vikings win 1969 NFL Championship, lose Super Bowl IV.
|-

|-
| 
| style="| 
| style="| Vikings  30–17
| style="| Vikings  24–20
| Tie  9–9–2 
| Both teams placed in the NFC Central after AFL-NFL merger.
|-
| 
| style="| 
| style="| Vikings  16–13
| style="| Vikings  29–10
| Vikings  11–9–2 
| Vikings take first series lead in the rivalry, a lead that has yet to be relinquished since.
|-
| 
| style="| 
| style="| Vikings  34–10
| style="| Vikings  16–13
| Vikings  13–9–2 
| 
|-
| 
| style="| 
| style="| Vikings  23–9
| style="| Vikings  28–7
| Vikings  15–9–2   
| Vikings lose Super Bowl VIII.
|-
| 
| Tie 1–1
| style="| Vikings  7–6
| style="| Lions  20–16
| Vikings  16–10–2     
| Vikings win 13 straight meetings (1968–74).  Lions win in Bloomington came as the Lions intercepted a pass in the end zone on the game's final play.  Vikings lose Super Bowl IX.
|-
| 
| Tie 1–1
| style="| Lions  17–10
| style="| Vikings  25–19
| Vikings  17–11–2       
| Lions open Pontiac Silverdome.
|-
| 
| style="| 
| style="| Vikings  10–9
| style="| Vikings  31–23
| Vikings  19–11–2    
| Vikings lose Super Bowl XI.
|-
| 
| style="| 
| style="| Vikings  30–21
| style="| Vikings  14–7
| Vikings  21–11–2      
| 
|-
| 
| Tie 1–1
| style="| Lions  45–14
| style="| Vikings  17–7
| Vikings  22–12–2
| 
|-
| 
| style="| 
| style="| Vikings  13–10
| style="| Vikings  14–7
| Vikings  24–12–2  
| 
|-

|-
| 
| Tie 1–1
| style="| Lions  27–7
| style="| Vikings  34–0
| Vikings  25–13–2  
| 
|-
| 
| Tie 1–1
| style="| Lions  45–7
| style="| Vikings  26–24
| Vikings  26–14–2  
|
|-
| 
| style="| 
| style="| Vikings  34–31 
| no game
| Vikings  27–14–2 
| Game in Minneapolis cancelled due to players strike reducing the season to 9 games.  Vikings move to Hubert H. Humphrey Metrodome. 
|-
| 
| Tie 1–1
| style="| Lions  13–2
| style="| Vikings  20–17
| Vikings  28–15–2 
| Vikings win 7 straight home meetings (1976–83)
|-
| 
| Tie 1–1
| style="| Vikings  29–28
| style="| Lions  16–14
| Vikings  29–16–2 
| 
|-
| 
| Tie 1–1
| style="| Lions  41–21
| style="| Vikings  16–13
| Vikings  30–17–2 
| 
|-
| 
| Tie 1–1
| style="| Vikings  24–10
| style="| Lions  13–10
| Vikings  31–18–2 
| 
|-
| 
| style="| 
| style="| Vikings  17–14
| style="| Vikings  34–19
| Vikings  33–18–2    
| 
|-
| 
| style="| 
| style="| Vikings  23–0
| style="| Vikings  44–17
| Vikings  35–18–2     
| Game in Pontiac took place on Thanksgiving.
|-
| 
| style="| 
| style="| Vikings  20–7
| style="| Vikings  24–17
| Vikings  37–18–2   
| Vikings win 7 straight meetings (1986–89).
|-

|-
| 
| Tie 1–1
| style="| Vikings  17–7
| style="| Lions  34–27
| Vikings  38–19–2 
| 
|-
| 
| style="| 
| style="| Lions  10–6 
| style="| Lions  34–14
| Vikings  38–21–2     
| Lions' first season sweep since 1962.  Barry Sanders rushed for 220 yards and four touchdowns in the game in Minneapolis.
|-
| 
| Tie 1–1
| style="| Lions  31–17
| style="| Vikings  31–14
| Vikings  39–22–2 
| 
|-
| 
| Tie 1–1
| style="| Vikings  13–0
| style="| Lions  30–27
| Vikings  40–23–2    
|
|-
| 
| Tie 1–1
| style="| Lions  41–19
| style="| Vikings  10–3
| Vikings  41–24–2  
| 
|-
| 
| Tie 1–1
| style="| Lions  44–38
| style="| Vikings  20–10
| Vikings  42–25–2 
| Lions' 44–38 win is the highest scoring game in the rivalry's history (82 points). Game in Pontiac took place on Thanksgiving.
|-
| 
| style="| 
| style="| Vikings  24–22
| style="| Vikings  17–13
| Vikings  44–25–2  
| 
|-
| 
| style="| 
| style="| Lions  38–15 
| style="| Lions  14–13
| Vikings  44–27–2     
| 
|-
| 
| style="| 
| style="| Vikings  34–13
| style="| Vikings  29–6
| Vikings  46–27–2 
| 
|-
| 
| Tie 1–1
| style="| Lions  25–23
| style="| Vikings  24–17
| Vikings  47–28–2  
| The meeting in Minnesota assured the winner would host their first playoff game, a Lions' victory in this game would've resulted in a rematch the following week in the Wild Card Round in Detroit.
|-

|-
| 
| style="| 
| style="| Vikings  31–24
| style="| Vikings  24–17
| Vikings  49–28–2  
| Vikings' WR Randy Moss has 168 receiving yards and 3 touchdowns in the game in Detroit.
|-
| 
| Tie 1–1
| style="| Lions  27–24
| style="| Vikings  31–26
| Vikings  50–29–2   
| 
|-
| 
| style="| 
| style="| Vikings  38–36
| style="| Vikings  27–23
| Vikings  52–29–2   
| Lions open Ford Field.
|-
| 
| style="| 
| style="| Vikings  23–13
| style="| Vikings  24–14
| Vikings  54–29–2     
| 
|-
| 
| style="| 
| style="| Vikings  28–27
| style="| Vikings  22–19
| Vikings  56–29–2     
| 
|- 
| 
| style="| 
| style="| Vikings  21–16
| style="| Vikings  27–14
| Vikings  58–29–2     
|
|-
| 
| style="| 
| style="| Vikings  30–20
| style="| Vikings  26–17
| Vikings  60–29–2   
| Vikings win 10 straight meetings (2002–06).
|-
| 
| Tie 1–1
| style="| Lions  20–17
| style="| Vikings  42–10
| Vikings  61–30–2    
| 
|-
| 
| style="| 
| style="| Vikings  20–16
| style="| Vikings  12–10
| Vikings  63–30–2 
| Lions' QB Dan Orlovsky infamously runs out of the back of his own end zone for a safety in the game in Minneapolis.  Lions complete first 0–16 season in NFL history.
|-
| 
| style="| 
| style="| Vikings  27–13
| style="| Vikings  27–10
| Vikings  65–30–2 
| 
|-

|-
| 
| Tie 1–1
| style="| Lions  20–13
| style="| Vikings  24–10
| Vikings  66–31–2   
| Vikings win 13 straight home meetings.
|-
| 
| style="| 
| style="| Lions  34–28 
| style="| Lions  26–23(OT)
| Vikings  66–33–2  
| Lions win in Minneapolis (and sweep the season series) for first time since 1997.
|-
| 
| style="| 
| style="| Vikings  20–13
| style="| Vikings  34–24
| Vikings  68–33–2 
| 
|-
| 
| Tie 1–1
| style="| Lions  34–24
| style="| Vikings  14–13
| Vikings  69–34–2 
| Game in Minneapolis was the final game played at the Metrodome.
|-
| 
| style="| 
| style="| Lions  16–14 
| style="| Lions  17–3
| Vikings  69–36–2  
| Vikings move to TCF Bank Stadium.  
|-
| 
| style="| 
| style="| Vikings  28–19
| style="| Vikings  26–16
| Vikings  71–36–2
| 
|-
| 
| style="| 
| style="| Lions  16–13 
| style="| Lions  22–16(OT)
| Vikings  71–38–2  
| Vikings open U.S. Bank Stadium. Detroit meeting took place on Thanksgiving.
|-
| 
| Tie 1–1
| style="| Vikings  30–23
| style="| Lions  14–7
| Vikings  72–39–2 
| First time since 1993 that the away team won both meetings. Detroit meeting took place on Thanksgiving.
|-
| 
| style="| 
| style="| Vikings  27–9
| style="| Vikings  24–9
| Vikings  74–39–2 
| 
|-
| 
| style="| 
| style="| Vikings  42–30
| style="| Vikings  20–7
| Vikings  76–39–2
| 
|-

|-
| 
| style="| 
| style="| Vikings  37–35
| style="| Vikings  34–20
| Vikings  78–39–2 
|
|-
| 
|Tie 1–1
| style="| Lions  29–27
| style="| Vikings  19–17
| Vikings  79–40–2 
| Vikings win 8 straight meetings (2017–21).
|-
| 
|Tie 1–1
| style="| Lions  34–23
| style="| Vikings  28–24
| Vikings  80–41–2 
|
|- 

|-
| Regular season
| style="|
| 
| 
| 
|-

See also
 Michigan–Minnesota football rivalry

References

External links
 NFL.com All-Time Team vs. Team Results
 mcubed.net's Lions-Vikings Series History 1966-present

Further reading

Detroit Lions
Minnesota Vikings
National Football League rivalries
Minnesota Vikings rivalries
Detroit Lions rivalries